Araeosoma eurypatum is a species of sea urchin of the family Echinothuriidae. Their armour is covered with spines. It is placed in the genus Araeosoma and lives in the sea. Araeosoma eurypatum was first scientifically described in 1909 by Alexander Agassiz and Hubert Clark.

See also 
Araeosoma coriacea
Araeosoma coriaceum
Araeosoma fenestratum

References 

eurypatum
Animals described in 1909
Taxa named by Alexander Agassiz
Taxa named by Hubert Lyman Clark